The following highways are numbered 507:

Canada
 Alberta Highway 507
 Manitoba Provincial Road 507
 Ontario Highway 507 (former)

Costa Rica
 National Route 507

India
 National Highway 507 (India)

Japan
 Japan National Route 507

United States
  Florida State Road 507
 Florida State Road 507 (pre-1945) (former)
  County Road 507 (Brevard County, Florida)
  Montana Secondary Highway 507
  County Route 507 (New Jersey)
  Ohio State Route 507
  Pennsylvania Route 507
  Puerto Rico Highway 507
  Washington State Route 507